ATM Nurul Bashar Chowdhury Bangladesh Nationalist Party politician. He was elected a member of parliament from Cox's Bazar-2 in February 1996.

Early life 
ATM Nurul Bashar Chowdhury Md. Ishak was born on 1 January 1934 in Cox's Bazar District⋅

Career 
Chowdhury is the senior vice president and former general secretary of Cox's Bazar district BNP. He was the chairman of Kutubdia Upazila Parishad and the elected chairman of Ali Akbar Dale Union for 5 consecutive terms.

He was elected to parliament from Cox's Bazar-2 as a Bangladesh Nationalist Party candidate in 15 February 1996 Bangladeshi general election.

References 

Living people
People from Cox's Bazar District
Bangladesh Nationalist Party politicians
6th Jatiya Sangsad members
Year of birth missing (living people)